basketballscotland is the governing body of the sport of basketball in Scotland. The organisation manages national competitions and runs the Scotland national basketball team.  They also have a cup final for all age groups of the course of a weekend during the early months of the year.

They are also founder members of the reformed Great Britain national basketball team.

National Leagues 
Scottish Basketball Championship
Scottish Basketball Championship Women
U18 Men's National League
U18 Women's National League
U16 Men's National League
U16 Women's National League

Regional Leagues
Strathclyde Basketball League
Lothian Basketball League
Grampian Basketball League
Highland Basketball League
Tayside & Fife Basketball League

National Teams 
Great Britain national basketball team
Scotland national basketball team

See also
Robert Archibald
Iain MacLean
Commonwealth Games Council for Scotland
Sport in Scotland

External links 
 

Basketball
Sport in Edinburgh
Basketball in Scotland
Scot